Sir Barry Denny, 1st Baronet (c. 1744 – April 1794) was an Anglo-Irish politician. The Denny family effectively owned the town of Tralee.

Denny was the son of Reverend Barry Denny and Jane O'Connor. He served in the Tralee Corps of the Irish Volunteers, becoming a colonel. He later gained the rank of Major in the service of the Kerry Militia. He was elected to the Irish House of Commons as the Member of Parliament for County Kerry, representing the seat between 1769 and 1776, and again between 1783 and 1794.  In 1774, he held the office of High Sheriff of Kerry. He was created a baronet, of Castle Moyle in the Baronetage of Ireland on 12 January 1782.

Denny married a cousin, Jane, the daughter of Sir Thomas Denny and Agnes Blennerhassett, in 1767. Together they had eight children, including the second and third baronets.

References

Year of birth uncertain
1794 deaths
Baronets in the Baronetage of Ireland
18th-century Anglo-Irish people
Irish MPs 1769–1776
Irish MPs 1783–1790
Irish MPs 1790–1797
High Sheriffs of Kerry
Members of the Parliament of Ireland (pre-1801) for County Kerry constituencies